MedStar Georgetown University Hospital is one of the Washington, D.C. area's oldest academic teaching hospitals. It is a not-for-profit, acute care teaching and research facility located in the Georgetown neighborhood of the Northwest Quadrant of Washington, D.C. MedStar Georgetown is co-located with the Georgetown University Medical Center and is affiliated with the Georgetown University School of Medicine. MedStar Georgetown is home to the Georgetown Lombardi Comprehensive Cancer Center, as well as centers of excellence in the neurology, neurosurgery, psychiatry, gastroenterology, transplant and vascular surgery. Originally named Georgetown University Hospital, it became part of the MedStar Health network in 2000.

The hospital has 609 licensed beds and employs over 4,000 personnel.

Currently, the hospital is in the midst of a $600 million expansion with the construction of the new Medical/Surgical Pavilion.

History 

Georgetown University Hospital was founded in 1898 as part of Georgetown University. The facility opened with 33 beds and was staffed by the Sisters of St. Francis of Philadelphia. The Hospital moved to its current location on Reservoir Road NW in 1930. In 1946, the Sisters of Charity of Nazareth took over operation of the hospital.

In the past century the hospital has grown to include a community physician practice, the Lombardi Cancer Center and scores of clinical departments and divisions. Through its 100-year relationship with Georgetown University, the hospital collaborates in training students from both the School of Medicine (almost 500 residents and fellows annually) and the School of Nursing & Health Studies. Additionally, MedStar Georgetown University Hospital works closely with the university's research enterprise to help bring innovative therapies from the scientific laboratory to the patient bedside. The Main Hospital was built in 1947 and was the first building erected in what is now the MedStar Georgetown University Hospital complex. The hospital, now more than 80 percent renovated, houses multiple patient units, hospital administration offices, and hospital support services. In July 2000, Georgetown University entered into a partnership with Medstar Health, a not-for-profit organization of two other Washington hospitals and five Baltimore hospitals, including another Catholic hospital. This partnership greatly improves the clinical efficiency and increases the diversity of clinical experiences available to students. The new Georgetown/Medstar partnership remains committed to the Catholic Jesuit ideals of care for the whole patient and service to those less fortunate. As the School of Medicine enters its 150th Anniversary year, the hospital has just completed its centennial celebration  With primary care providers at nine sites in Washington, D.C., Maryland and Virginia, MedStar Georgetown University Hospital's clinical services represent one of the largest, most geographically diverse and fully integrated healthcare delivery networks in the area. M. Joy Drass, MD, an alumna of Georgetown University School of Medicine, was appointed President of MedStar Georgetown University Hospital in October, 2000 and continues to lead the hospital today.

The hospital was ranked in 13 specialty areas in the 2001 U.S. News & World Report "Best Hospitals" issue. MedStar Georgetown was ranked in more categories than any other Washington-area hospital was awarded Magnet Status by the American Nurses Credentialing Center (ANCC) in 2004. MedStar Georgetown was the first, and remains the only, hospital in the District to be awarded this distinction. In 1988, the hospital was involved in the important United States Supreme Court case Bowen v. Georgetown University Hospital, in which the court held that agencies may not promulgate retroactive rules unless expressly authorized by Congress.

Current operations 

The research and education programs affiliated with MedStar Georgetown University Hospital continue to be administered by Georgetown University Medical Center. These include the residency and fellowship programs, as well as clinical trials.

Some of the specialty areas in which it has been ranked among the top hospitals in recent years include cancer, digestive disorders, ear-nose and throat, geriatrics, gynecology, heart disease, hormonal disorders, kidney disease, neurology, neuro-surgery, psychiatry, respiratory disorders, rheumatology, urology, gastroenterology and orthopaedics. The Lombardi Comprehensive Care Center is the only facility in the Washington, D.C. area designated by the National Cancer Institute (NCI) as a Comprehensive Care Center. MedStar Georgetown's Transplant Institute is ranked among the best in the mid-Atlantic region by the Scientific Registry of Transplant Recipients for liver transplant outcomes and is one of few centers in the country to provide living-donor liver transplants.  Georgetown Neurosciences is the first on the East Coast and the sixth in the nation to offer the CyberKnife, the latest in stereotactic radiosurgery to treat tumors and lesions of the brain, neck and spine.

Additionally, MedStar Georgetown is home to the Lombardi Comprehensive Cancer Center,  the only facility in the Washington, D.C. area designated by the National Cancer Institute (NCI) as a Comprehensive Cancer Center. In 2000, Georgetown University Hospital became part of MedStar Health, a non–profit network of seven regional hospitals, which together see more than 7000 new cancer patients annually. The Lombardi MedStar Research Network has been a great success, both with increased accrual to clinical trials and increased Cancer Center membership. In 2007, over 200 patients were accrued to therapeutic trials.

Hospital rating data
The HealthGrades website contains the clinical quality data for Medstar Georgetown University Hospital, as of 2018. For this rating section clinical quality rating data, patient safety ratings and patient experience ratings are presented.

For inpatient conditions and procedures, there are three possible ratings: worse than expected, as expected, better than expected.  For this hospital the data for this category is:
Worse than expected – 6
As expected – 17
Better than expected – 1

For patient safety ratings the same three possible ratings are used. For this hospital they are"
Worse than expected – 4
As expected – 8
Better than expected – 1

Percentage of patients rating this hospital as a 9 or 10 – 70%
Percentage of patients who on average rank hospitals as a 9 or 10 – 69%

Notable births, hospitalizations, and deaths

Births
Blelvis, January 8, 1966
Douglas Harriman Kennedy, March 24, 1967
John F. Kennedy Jr., November 25, 1960
Robert F. Kennedy Jr., January 17, 1954
Rory Kennedy, December 12, 1968
Mark Kennedy Shriver, February 17, 1964

Hospitalizations
Eddie Foster, 1913
Frank Gill, 1982
Rudy Giuliani, 2020
Ralph McGehee, 1972

Deaths

Juan Pablo Pérez Alfonzo, September 3, 1979
Henry F. Ashurst, May 31, 1962
Mustafa Barzani, March 1, 1979
Ben H. Brown Jr., May 25, 1989
Thomas McPherson Brown, April 17, 1989
Katharine Byron, December 28, 1976
John Moors Cabot, February 24, 1981
Walter Compton, December 9, 1959
Douglas DeGood, December 1, 2019
Charles Burke Elbrick, April 12, 1983
John H. Fanning, July 21, 1990
James C. Fletcher, December 22, 1991
Don Flickinger, February 23, 1997
J. Eugene Gallery, July 28, 1960
William C. Gloth, December 3, 1944
Guy L. Goodwin, December 10, 2007
Robert Newton Harper, September 23, 1940
Robert O. Harris, October 1, 2007
Robert W. Hasbrouck, August 19, 1985
Joseph J. Himmel, November 3, 1924
John Jay Hopkins, May 3, 1957
Peter Leo Ireton, April 27, 1958
Henry Arnold Karo, May 23, 1986
Jan Karski, July 13, 2000
Richard T. Kennedy, January 12, 1998
Ray Krouse, April 9, 1966
Evelyn Lincoln, May 11, 1995
Vince Lombardi, September 3, 1970
Stasys Lozoraitis Jr., June 13, 1994
Frank Lyon, November 29, 1955
Lester Machta, August 31, 2001
Stephen May, March 31, 2016
Brien McMahon, July 28, 1952
Lillian B. Miller, November 27, 1997
J. Murray Mitchell, October 5, 1990
Raymond Muir, June 23, 1954
John O'Donnell, December 17, 1961 
Arthur A. O'Leary, February 8, 1962
Glenn E. Plumb, August 1, 1922
David H. Popper, July 24, 2008
Carroll Quigley, January 3, 1977
William Reinhart, February 14, 1971
James J. Reynolds, October 9, 1986
Stephen N. Shulman, January 22, 2011
Ormond Simkins, December 4, 1921
Walter T. Skallerup Jr., July 29, 1987 
Tony Snow, July 12, 2008
Harold P. Stern, April 3, 1977
Jack Swigert, December 27, 1982
John Sylvester, July 26, 1990
Bertram D. Tallamy, December 1, 1901
Robert H. Thayer, January 26, 1984
Caroline van Hook Bean, December 24, 1980
Ellen Hardin Walworth, June 23, 1915
Paul W. Ward, November 24, 1976
Earl Warren, July 9, 1974
Hugh Seton-Watson, December 19, 1984
James E. Webb, March 27, 1992
Edward Bennett Williams, August 13, 1988
Frank J. Wilson, June 22, 1970
Raymond Workman, August 21, 1966
Lawrence A. Wright, March 19, 2000
Charles Yost, May 21, 1981

References

External links 

MedStar Georgetown University Hospital
MedStar Health
Lombardi Comprehensive Cancer Center
 Georgetown University School of Medicine

Hospital
Georgetown University Medical Center
Teaching hospitals in Washington, D.C.
Hospital buildings completed in 1898
Hospital buildings completed in 1930
Hospitals established in 1898
1898 establishments in Washington, D.C.
Catholic hospitals in North America
Catholic health care